Haven  is a given name of English origin derived from the vocabulary word describing a place or state of safety.

Popularity
The name has been among the one thousand most popular names used for girls in the United States since 
1996 and among the top five hundred names for girls since 2012. It is also in occasional use for boys in the United States.

Notable people with the name include:

 Haven J. Barlow (1922–2022), American politician
 Haven Denney (born 1995), American pair skater andi 2012 US junior pair champion
 Haven Gillespie (1888–1975), American composer and lyricist who wrote the song "Santa Claus Is Coming to Town"
 Haven Kimmel (born 1965), American author, novelist and poet
 Haven Monahan, the alleged perpetrator of the sexual assault depicted in the now-retracted Rolling Stone article "A Rape on Campus"
 Haven Moses (born 1946), former American Football League and National Football League player

Notes